The short-tailed roundleaf bat (Hipposideros curtus) is a species of bat in the family Hipposideridae. It is found in Cameroon and Equatorial Guinea. Its natural habitats are subtropical or tropical moist lowland forests and caves. It is threatened by habitat loss.

Taxonomy
It was described as a new species in 1921 by American mammalogist Glover Morrill Allen. The holotype had been collected in 1920 by Reverend George W. Schwab in Sackbayeme, Cameroon.
Its species name "curtus" is Latin for "short". Morrill noted that it could be distinguished from other closely related bats by its very short tail.

As the bat genus Hipposideros is very speciose, it is traditionally subdivided into species groups. The short-tailed roundleaf bat is within the bicolor species group.

Description

Range and habitat
It has been confirmed in Cameroon and Equatorial Guinea; additionally, its range may include Nigeria. Its habitat is lowland tropical forest.

In 2016 a population of the species was discovered near to the Afi Mountain Wildlife Sanctuary in southern Nigeria by the ecologist Iroro Tanshi, who worked with local people to conserve the population.

Conservation
It is listed as endangered by the IUCN.

References

Hipposideros
Mammals described in 1921
Bats of Africa
Taxa named by Glover Morrill Allen
Taxonomy articles created by Polbot